Erwin Aníbal Ramírez Castro (born November 13, 1971) is a retired football goalkeeper from Ecuador.

International career
He obtained a total number of eight caps for the Ecuador national football team in 1991. In that year he played all matches for Ecuador, and scored a penalty kick against Bolivia (4-0) at the 1991 Copa América in Chile. Ramirez was also a member of the Ecuadorian youth squad at the 1987 FIFA U-16 World Championship.

References
FIFA profile

External links

1971 births
Living people
Association football goalkeepers
Ecuadorian footballers
Ecuador international footballers
1991 Copa América players
C.D. Quevedo footballers
C.S. Emelec footballers
S.D. Quito footballers
C.D. Técnico Universitario footballers
C.D. ESPOLI footballers
C.S.D. Macará footballers
L.D.U. Quito footballers
Manta F.C. footballers
Delfín S.C. footballers